Loren Wilber Acton (born 7 March 1936) is an American physicist who flew on Space Shuttle mission STS-51-F as a Payload Specialist for the Lockheed Palo Alto Research Laboratory. He is also the father of Cheryll Glotfelty, a leading ecocritic.

Early life and education 
Acton was born in Lewistown, Montana. He received a bachelor of science degree in Engineering Physics from Montana State University in 1959, and a Doctor of Philosophy in Astro-Geophysics from the University of Colorado at Boulder in 1965.

Career 
Acton was a senior staff scientist with the Space Sciences Laboratory, Lockheed Palo Alto Research Laboratory, California. As a research scientist, his principal duties included conducting scientific studies of the Sun and other celestial objects using advanced space instruments and serving as a co-investigator on one of the Spacelab 2 solar experiments, the Solar Optical Universal Polarimeter. He was selected as one of four payload specialists for Spacelab 2 on August 9, 1978, and after seven years of training he flew on STS-51-F/ Spacelab-2 in 1985. At mission conclusion, Acton had travelled over 2.8 million miles in 126 Earth orbits, logging over 190 hours in space.

Acton is married and has two children.  In 2006 he ran in an election to be the state representative of Montana's District 69, as a Democratic candidate. In the event, he lost to the Republican incumbent, Jack M. Wells of Belgrade.

Acton is currently a retired Research Professor of Physics at Montana State University, where he was responsible for the formation of the Solar Physics group and the Space Science and Engineering Laboratory.  The MSU solar group carries on an active research program under NASA and NSF support and is actively involved in day-to-day operation and scientific utilization of satellite missions for studies of the Sun. Acton was a principal investigator for Soft X-ray Telescope (SXT) experiment on the Japan/US/UK Yohkoh mission  The Yohkoh mission focused on the study of high-energy solar processes, such as solar flares, eruptions and the heating of the corona. The primary emission of the extremely hot outer atmosphere of the sun, the solar corona, is at X-ray wavelengths. The extended duration, high resolution, X-ray imagery from Yohkoh contribute to the study of why the sun has a corona at all and why it varies in intensity so strongly in response to the 11-year sunspot cycle.

Awards
2000 George Ellery Hale Prize by the Solar Physics Division of the American Astronomical Society
Recognized in February 2020 as Legacy Fellow of American Astronomical Society
2017 The Order of the Rising Sun, Gold Rays with Neck Ribbon by Japanese government

References

External links 
NASA Biography
Spacefacts biography of Loren Acton
Loren Acton Academic Homepage
Montana State University Solar Physics Group
Montana State University Physics Department
Montana State University
World Championship in Cooperation

1936 births
Living people
21st-century American physicists
Science teachers
People from Lewistown, Montana
University of Colorado alumni
Montana Democrats
Montana State University alumni
NASA civilian astronauts
Lockheed Martin people
American astronaut-politicians
Space Shuttle program astronauts
Fellows of the American Astronomical Society